Applejack or apple jack may refer to:

Entertainment
 Apple Jack, a 2003 American short film directed by Mark Whiting
 Captain Applejack, a 1931 American comedy film
 Apple Jack (video game), a game on Xbox Live Indie Games

Food
 Applejack (drink), an American strong alcoholic drink produced from apples
 Apple Jacks, a brand of American breakfast cereal made by Kellogg's

Music
 The Applejacks (disambiguation), several musical groups
 Applejack, an early name of the Canadian rock band Trooper (band)
"Applejack" (song), a 1963 song by Jet Harris and Tony Meehan
 "Applejack", song by Dolly Parton from her 1977 album New Harvest...First Gathering

Other uses
 Applejack, a character in the My Little Pony franchise
 AppleJack, troubleshooting software for Mac OS X
 Wellesley Applejacks, a Canadian Junior ice hockey team in Wellesley, Ontario, Canada